Adoration of the Christ Child  may refer to one of the following Renaissance paintings:

 Adoration of the Christ Child (Bosch), c. 1568 or later
 Adoration of the Christ Child (Bramantino), c. 1485
 Adoration of the Christ Child (Correggio), c. 1526
 Adoration of the Christ Child (Gentile da Fabriano), c. 1420–1421
 Adoration of the Christ Child (Honthorst), c. 1619–1621
 Adoration of the Christ Child (Lippi, Florence), c. 1463
 Adoration of the Christ Child (Lippi, Prato), c. 1455–1466
 Adoration of the Christ Child (Lotto, Kraków), 1508
 Adoration of the Christ Child (Lotto, Washington), 1523
 Adoration of the Christ Child (Uccello), 1431 or 1437
 Adoration of the Christ Child with Saint Jerome, Saint Mary Magdalene and Saint Eustace, by Uccello, c. 1436